"Pinocchio's Nose" is the tenth episode of the seventh season of the South Korean anthology series KBS Drama Special. Starring Lee Yoo-ri, Lee Ha-yool and Park Chan-hwan, it aired on KBS2 on November 27, 2016.

Synopsis
15 years ago, Yoon Da-jung's (Lee Yoo-ri) mother Kim Young-hee (Kim Ye-ryeong) disappeared and her father Yoon Nam-ho (Park Chan-hwan) was arrested for her murder. He was later released due to lack of evidence.

One day, her mother's car is found in a reservoir with a skeleton in it. Her father is arrested again. W

Cast
Lee Yu-ri as Yoon Da-jung
Kim Ji-young as young Da-jung
Lee Go-eun as child Da-jung
Lee Ha-yool as Kang In-gook
Park Chan-hwan as Yoon Nam-ho
Mi Ram as Yoon Da-rae
Kim Ye-ryeong as Kim Young-hee

References

External links 
 Pinocchio's Nose official KBS website 
 
 
 

2016 South Korean television episodes